Pierre Dufour is a Swiss retired slalom canoeist who competed in the early-to-mid 1950s. He won two medals in the C-2 team event at the ICF Canoe Slalom World Championships with a silver in 1953 and a bronze in 1951.

References

Swiss male canoeists
Possibly living people
Year of birth missing
Medalists at the ICF Canoe Slalom World Championships